The Baja California rainbow trout or San Pedro Martir trout or Nelson's trout (Oncorhynchus mykiss nelsoni) is a localized subspecies of the rainbow trout (Oncorhynchus mykiss), a freshwater fish in the family Salmonidae.

Baja California rainbow trout is one of many species of Mexican native trout.

Distribution
It is endemic to headwater tributaries of the Rio Santo Domingo in the Sierra de San Pedro Mártir mountain range of the Peninsular Ranges System, located in  Baja California state on the northern Baja California Peninsula.

Taxonomy

19th century
The first records of trout in northwestern Mexico were published by paleontologist E. D. Cope in 1886 where he describes two specimens from Chihuahua as having the appearance of Salmo purpuratus a name sometimes incorrectly used for cutthroat trout (Oncorhynchus clarki). In 1898 and 1905, naturalist E. W. Nelson with the U.S. Biological Survey led explorations into the Mexican mainland (1898) and Baja California Peninsula (1905) to document flora and fauna.

20th century
In 1908, preserved specimens of trout that Nelson brought back from the Rio Santo Domingo (Santo Domingo creek) in the Sierra de San Pedro Mártir mountains of Baja California were described by ichthyologist B.W. Evermann as a new species Salmo nelsoni, the Baja rainbow trout.

In 1989, morphological and genetic studies indicated trout of the Pacific basin were genetically closer to Pacific salmon (Oncorhynchus species) than to the Salmos–brown trout (S. trutta) or Atlantic salmon (S. salar) of the Atlantic basin.  Thus, in 1989, taxonomic authorities moved the rainbow, cutthroat and other Pacific basin trout, including the Mexican native trout into the genus Oncorhynchus.  Thus Salmo mykiss nelsoni became O. m. nelsoni.

See also

References

Oncorhynchus
Trout, Baja California
Endemic fauna of the Baja California Peninsula
Natural history of the Peninsular Ranges
Subspecies